KLQ can refer to:

 Kids' Lit Quiz, an annual literature competition founded in 1991 in New Zealand and now also in the United Kingdom, South Africa, Canada, United States, Australia, Hong Kong and Singapore
 Kullorsuaq Heliport (IATA airport code), in Kullorsuaq, Greenland
 WTNR (FM), a radio station in Grand Rapids, Michigan, formerly known as 107.3 KLQ
 KLQ.com, an internet radio station formerly on 107.3 FM in Grand Rapids, Michigan